Agop Melkonyan (March 10, 1949 in Burgas – July 23, 2006 in Sofia) was a Bulgarian writer of Armenian descent. He is best known as an author of science fiction short stories and novels. He was also a translator, journalist, editor and scholar.

Melkonyan popularized in Bulgaria recent discoveries in physics, astronomy and mechanics. His literary influence spread mainly through such Bulgarian periodical editions as Orbita, Omega and Varkolak.

Melkonyan was awarded the most important Bulgarian prize for science fiction Gravition in 1991. There is a literary prize on his name and a widely popular memorial anthology was published in 2017 under the title A Machine for Stories. Melkonyan's story A Boy with Wings (‘Momche s krila’) is included in the primary schools’ program.

His translations, mostly from Russian and Armenian, include both poetry and prose (works by his friends Arkady and Boris Strugatsky among others).

His works, translated into many European languages, include: the prose collections A Memory of the World ('Spomen za sveta', 1980), Via Dolorosa, 1987, Death in the Sea-Shell ('Smart v rakovinata', 1994), A Turmoil for Souls ('Sumatoha za dushite', 2004) and others.

References

Bibliography

Агоп Мелконян (1949-2006), В: "Тера фантастика" / 2011, p. 8-23.

Милоев, Велко (състав.) и др., Спомен за света на Агоп Мелконян, София, ИК Ерато-арт, 2008.

External links
 Words without Borders Biography
 Science Fiction in Bulgaria 2006
 An Interview with Agop Melkonyan
 A Boy with Wings (short story)
 Obituary
 Armenian Poetry Translations
 Biography in Russian
 Biography and Bibliography in Russian

Bulgarian male writers
Bulgarian male short story writers
Bulgarian science fiction writers
Bulgarian novelists
Bulgarian translators
Bulgarian journalists
1949 births
2006 deaths
Writers from Burgas
Bulgarian people of Armenian descent
Translators from Russian
Translators from Armenian
20th-century Bulgarian novelists
20th-century Bulgarian short story writers
20th-century translators
20th-century journalists